Stephen Rowlings (born 4 February 1976) is an English former professional snooker player from Preston, Lancashire. His only season on the professional tour was the 2009–10 season.

References

External links
 
 Player profile on World Snooker
 Player profile on Global Snooker

1976 births
Living people
English snooker players
Sportspeople from Preston, Lancashire